Max Topplin (born December 14, 1989) is a Canadian theatre, television and film actor. He was born in Toronto, Ontario. He made his debut on the television series Ghost Trackers. He is best known for his role in the USA Network legal drama Suits, where he played the recurring character Harold Gunderson.

Activism
Topplin is a director of LifePaths, a project focused on creating telemedicine systems to help in Haiti.

Filmography

Film

Television

References

External links

1989 births
Living people
Canadian male film actors
Canadian male television actors
Male actors from Toronto